We Not Naughty is a Singaporean comedy film directed by Jack Neo. It was officially released on 19 January 2012 in Singapore.

Themes
The film examines the problems faced by parents with their rebellious children in Singapore's current society. Other themes in the film include cyberbullying, peer pressure, gangsterism, morality and teacher-student relationships. A prominent theme relevant to Singaporean society is the social stigma about ITE students and favouritism towards students who excel academically.

Cast
 Shawn Lee as Chen Weijie
 Joshua Ang as Liu Jianren
 Xiang Yun as Mrs Chen, Weijie's mother
 Jacky Chin as Mr Chen, Weijie's father
 Ivan Lo Kai Jun as Ah Bao, Weijie's younger brother
 Cheryl Yeo as Nicole, Weijie's younger sister
 Amos Yee as Amos, Jianren's younger brother
 Yan Li Ming as Cynthia Pua, Jianren's mother
 Daniel Chan as Mr Liu CK
 Cherry Hsia as Mrs Liu
 Roy Li as Ah Long
 Eric Moo as Boss Ma 
 Ashley Leong as Alvin, ITP student
 Natalli Ong as Natalie, ITP student
 Tony Koh Beng Hoe as Ah Long 2

In addition, Lim Jiow Yong and Chia Kin Seng (ITE lecturers) are featured.

Synopsis
Chen Weijie and Liu Jianren are two ITP (International Technical Polytechnic, ostensibly a reference to the Institute of Technical Education) students who are constantly put down for being "dumb" despite the fact that they display a talent for designing and creating gadgets. Jianren comes from a wealthy single-parent home and is estranged from his mother and younger brother Amos, a fluent English speaker. He joins the gang of a local loanshark and becomes a runner. Weijie's father is a compulsive gambler who frequently swings from loving husband and father to crazed gambler running from loansharks. To complicate matters, his younger sister Nicole is academically gifted and pampered by their mother, thus causing frequent quarrels and misunderstanding amongst them. Unknown to the rest of them, Nicole becomes involved in a serious cyberbullying case and later becomes a victim of bullying herself.

One day Mr CK is announced as Weijie and Jianren's new class teacher. The young and energetic Mr CK tries hard to connect with the group but they fail to respond. He challenges them to a bet in a radio-controlled helicopter race and if he loses, he will do a run of ITP in the nude. The students defeat him and he honours his promise. The story and the controversy it caused made the national news. However, he had earned his students' respect and they responded accordingly when interviewed by the press. As a result, the board decide against dismissing him.

Unfortunately, one of Weijie and Jianren's "inventions" falls into criminal hands. This made Weijie, Jianren, Mr CK, his wife and Jianren's mum to travel to Johor Bahru, where Weijie and Jianren are tasked to use the invention to carry S$1000000 (which are actually drugs) by a few of their former gang members. The invention was close to crossing the Singapore-Malaysia border when Mr CK took control. Soon the gang members fought with Weijie, Jianren, Mr CK and Jianren's mum. Jianren's mum asked both Weijie and Jianren to escape while she suffers from an injury. Weijie and Jianren encounters Mr CK's wife, who is about to give birth. While the two are trying to help her give birth, they realised on what they have done wrong towards their parents. Soon after Mr CK's wife gave birth to a healthy baby, Weijie and Jianren are asked to help the police out using their invention to capture the criminals. Once the criminals are captured, Mr CK, his wife and Jianren's mum are admitted to the hospital while Weijie and Jianren thanked her for saving their lives.

Once again, Mr CK had hit the headlines and is proclaimed as a national hero. It was then revealed that Weijie and Jianren became winners of a national science competition.

References

External links
 

2012 films
Singaporean comedy films
2010s Mandarin-language films